Biancone is the name or a synonym of several French and Italian grape varieties including:

Biancone Gentile, also known as Biancu Gentile, on the island of Corsica
Biancone blanc, also known as Biancone di Portoferraio on the island of Elba
Biancone dell'Antella
Biancone della Pieve
Mostosa, an Italian variety also known as Biancone
Rollo (grape),  an Italian variety also known as Biancone
Trebbiano,  an Italian variety also known as Biancone